1-Heptacosanol is a fatty alcohol.

References

Fatty alcohols
Alkanols